Otter Creek Township is one of eleven townships in Ripley County, Indiana. As of the 2010 census, its population was 1,410 and it contained 608 housing units.

Geography

Cities and towns
 Holton

Unincorporated towns
 Allen Crossing
 Dabney
 Jackson

References

External links
 Indiana Township Association
 United Township Association of Indiana

Townships in Ripley County, Indiana
Townships in Indiana